Glipa oculata is a species of beetle in the genus Glipa. It was described in 1835.

References

oculata
Beetles described in 1835